Dawson Range may refer to:
Dawson Range (British Columbia)
Dawson Range (Queensland)
Dawson Range (Yukon)